In mathematics, a graded Lie algebra is a Lie algebra endowed with a gradation which is compatible with the Lie bracket.  In other words, a graded Lie algebra is a Lie algebra which is also a nonassociative graded algebra under the bracket operation.  A choice of Cartan decomposition endows any semisimple Lie algebra with the structure of a graded Lie algebra.  Any parabolic Lie algebra is also a graded Lie algebra.

A graded Lie superalgebra  extends the notion of a graded Lie algebra in such a way that the Lie bracket is no longer assumed to be necessarily anticommutative.  These arise in the study of derivations on graded algebras, in the deformation theory of Murray Gerstenhaber, Kunihiko Kodaira, and Donald C. Spencer, and in the theory of Lie derivatives.

A supergraded Lie superalgebra is a further generalization of this notion to the category of superalgebras in which a graded Lie superalgebra is endowed with an additional super -gradation.  These arise when one forms a graded Lie superalgebra in a classical (non-supersymmetric) setting, and then tensorizes to obtain the supersymmetric analog.

Still greater generalizations are possible to Lie algebras over a class of braided monoidal categories equipped with a coproduct and some notion of a gradation compatible with the braiding in the category.  For hints in this direction, see Lie superalgebra#Category-theoretic definition.

Graded Lie algebras 
In its most basic form, a graded Lie algebra is an ordinary Lie algebra , together with a gradation of vector spaces

such that the Lie bracket respects this gradation:

The universal enveloping algebra of a graded Lie algebra inherits the grading.

Examples

sl(2) 
For example, the Lie algebra  of trace-free 2 × 2 matrices is graded by the generators:

Free Lie algebra 

The free Lie algebra on a set X naturally has a grading, given by the minimum number of terms needed to generate the group element. This arises for example as the associated graded Lie algebra to the lower central series of a free group.

Generalizations 
In particular, any semisimple Lie algebra is graded by the root spaces of its adjoint representation.

Graded Lie superalgebras 
A graded Lie superalgebra over a field k (not of characteristic 2) consists of a graded vector space E over k, along with a bilinear bracket operation

such that the following axioms are satisfied.
[-, -] respects the gradation of E: 
(Symmetry) For all x in Ei and y in Ej, 
(Jacobi identity)  For all x in Ei, y in Ej, and z in Ek,  (If k has characteristic 3, then the Jacobi identity must be supplemented with the condition  for all x in Eodd.)

Note, for instance, that when E carries the trivial gradation, a graded Lie superalgebra over k is just an ordinary Lie algebra.  When the gradation of E is concentrated in even degrees, one recovers the definition of a (Z-)graded Lie algebra.

Examples and Applications 
The most basic example of a graded Lie superalgebra occurs in the study of derivations of graded algebras.  If A is a graded k-algebra with gradation

then a graded k-derivation d on A of degree l is defined by
, and

carries the structure of an A-module.  This generalizes the notion of a derivation of commutative algebras to the graded category.

On Der(A), one can define a bracket via:
[d, δ&hairsp;] = dδ − (−1)ijδd, for d ∈ Deri&hairsp;(A) and δ ∈ Derj&hairsp;(A).
Equipped with this structure, Der(A) inherits the structure of a graded Lie superalgebra over k.

Further examples:
 The Frölicher–Nijenhuis bracket is an example of a graded Lie algebra arising naturally in the study of connections in differential geometry.
 The Nijenhuis–Richardson bracket arises in connection with the deformations of Lie algebras.

Generalizations 
The notion of a graded Lie superalgebra can be generalized so that their grading is not just the integers.
  for all homogeneous elements x and y, and
 

Further examples:
A Lie superalgebra is a graded Lie superalgebra over the signed semiring , where  is the identity map for the additive structure on the ring .

Notes

References

See also 
 Differential graded Lie algebra
 Graded (mathematics)
 Lie algebra-valued form

Lie algebras